John R. Muether is Professor of Church History at Reformed Theological Seminary in Orlando, Florida, as well as the Library director. He is the co-editor of the Nicotine Theological Journal (along with D.G. Hart). He is a ruling elder in the Orthodox Presbyterian Church, as well as being their denominational historian.

Bibliography
 Reference Works for Theological Research: An Annotated Selective Bibliographical Guide (with Robert J. Kepple), 1992 
 Fighting the Good Fight: A Brief History of the Orthodox Presbyterian Church (with D. G. Hart), 1995 
 With Reverence and Awe: Returning to the Basics of Reformed Worship (with D. G. Hart), 2002 
 Creator, Redeemer, Consummator: A Festschrift for Meredith G. Kline (edited with Howard Griffith), 2007 
 Seeking a Better Country: 300 Years of American Presbyterianism (with D. G. Hart), 2007 
 Cornelius Van Til: Reformed Apologist and Churchman, 2008 
 Love on the Rocks: Stories of Rusticators and Romance on Mount Desert Island (with Kathryn Muether), 2008 
 Confident of Better Things: Essays Commemorating Seventy-Five Years of the Orthodox Presbyterian Church (edited with Danny E. Olinger), 2011

References

External links
Old Life Theological Society
Reformed Theological Seminary Faculty Page

American Calvinist and Reformed Christians
American Presbyterians
American religion academics
Living people
Orthodox Presbyterian Church members
Reformation historians
Editors of Christian publications
Year of birth missing (living people)